USASF may refer to:
United States Army Special Forces, also known as the Green Berets
U.S. All Star Federation, the governing body for all star cheerleading and dance in the United States